Robert Averell (born 1947) is a retired Northern Irish football centre back, best remembered for his two spells in the Irish League with Ballymena United. He also played in the North American Soccer League for Toronto Metros.

Career statistics

Honours 
Ballymena United

 City Cup: 1971–72

References

Association footballers from Northern Ireland
NIFL Premiership players
Coleraine F.C. players
Association football central defenders
1947 births
People from Magherafelt
Living people
North American Soccer League (1968–1984) players
Ballymena United F.C. players
Toronto Blizzard (1971–1984) players
Northern Ireland amateur international footballers
Expatriate association footballers from Northern Ireland
Expatriate sportspeople from Northern Ireland in Canada
Expatriate soccer players in Canada